Westlawn is a historic home located at Fayetteville, Cumberland County, North Carolina. It was built in 1858, and is a two-story, five bay, frame dwelling with a double-pile center-hall plan in the Greek Revival style.  It features a one-story, hip roofed porch supported by Doric order columns.  Also on the property is a contributing hip roofed smokehouse with cupola.

It was listed on the National Register of Historic Places in 1980.

References

Houses on the National Register of Historic Places in North Carolina
Greek Revival houses in North Carolina
Houses completed in 1858
Houses in Fayetteville, North Carolina
National Register of Historic Places in Cumberland County, North Carolina